Tabula Rasa is a nine-part 2017 Flemish-language TV series created by Veerle Baetens and Malin-Sarah Gozin and starring Veerle Baetens, Stijn Van Opstal and Jeroen Perceval. The plot revolves around Mie, a young woman with amnesia who is locked up in a secure psychiatric hospital.

It was released on October 29, 2017 on Eén.

Cast
 Veerle Baetens as Annemie D'Haeze
 Stijn Van Opstal as Benoit D'Haeze
 Jeroen Perceval as Thomas De Geest
 Gene Bervoets as Inspecteur Jacques Wolkers
 Natali Broods as Dr. Mommaerts
 Cécile Enthoven as Romy D'Haeze
 Ruth Beeckmans as Karen
 Hilde Van Mieghem as Rita
 Peter Van den Begin as Vronsky
 Lynn Van Royen as Nikki
 François Beukelaers as Walter
 Marc Peeters as Boswachter
 Tom Audenaert as Olivier
 Gregory Frateur as Jackson
 Bilall Fallah as Mozes
 Jan Debski as Schilpadman met bokaalbril

Release
Tabula Rasa was released on October 29, 2017 on Eén. The series was added as a Netflix Original series in all regions except the United Kingdom on March 15, 2018 but removed in April 2023.

References

External links
 
 
 

2010s Belgian television series
Dutch-language television shows
2017 Belgian television series debuts
Eén original programming